There have been two baronetcies created for members of the Waterlow family, both in the Baronetage of the United Kingdom. Both titles are extant as of 2010.

The Waterlow Baronetcy, of London, was created in the Baronetage of the United Kingdom on 4 August 1873 for the printer, philanthropist and Liberal politician Sydney Waterlow. The second Baronet was Chairman of Waterlow and Sons, Ltd. Sir Sydney Waterlow, son of George Sydney Waterlow, fourth son of the first Baronet, was Ambassador to Greece from 1933 to 1939.

The Waterlow Baronetcy, of Harrow Weald in the County of Middlesex, was created in the Baronetage of the United Kingdom on 28 October 1930 for William Waterlow, Managing Director of Waterlow Bros & Layton, Chairman of Waterlow and Sons Ltd and Lord Mayor of London between 1929 and 1930. He was the grandson of Alfred James Waterlow, elder brother of the first Baronet of the 1873 creation.

Waterlow baronets, of London (1873) 
Sir Sydney Hedley Waterlow, KCVO, 1st Baronet (1822–1906)
Sir Philip Hickson Waterlow, 2nd Baronet (1847–1931),
Sir Edgar Lutwyche Waterlow, 3rd Baronet (1870–1954)
Sir Philip Alexander Waterlow, 4th Baronet (1897–1973)
Sir Christopher Rupert Waterlow, 5th Baronet (born 1959)

The current heir presumptive is Antony Waterlow

Waterlow baronets, of Harrow Weald (1930) 
Sir William Alfred Waterlow, KBE, 1st Baronet (1871–1931)
Sir William James Waterlow, CBE, 2nd Baronet (1905–1969)
Sir Thomas Gordon Waterlow, CBE, 3rd Baronet (1911–1982)
Sir (James) Gerard Waterlow, 4th Baronet (1939–2013)
 Sir Thomas James Waterlow, 5th Baronet (born 1970)

The heir presumptive is the present holder's uncle John William Waterlow (born 1945).

References
Kidd, Charles, Williamson, David (editors). Debrett's Peerage and Baronetage (1990 edition). New York: St Martin's Press, 1990.

Waterlow